The swamp palm bulbul (Thescelocichla leucopleura), is a species of songbird in the bulbul family, Pycnonotidae. It is monotypic within the genus Thescelocichla.

Taxonomy and systematics
The swamp palm bulbul was originally described in the genus Phyllastrephus. Alternative names for the swamp palm bulbul include the swamp bulbul, swamp greenbul, swamp palm greenbul, white-tailed greenbul and white-tailed palm greenbul. The alternate name 'white-tailed greenbul' is also used by the honeyguide greenbul and Sjöstedt's greenbul.

Distribution and habitat
The swamp palm bulbul is found from Senegal and Gambia to north-eastern and central Democratic Republic of the Congo and northern Angola. Its natural habitats are subtropical or tropical dry forests, subtropical or tropical swamps, and moist savanna.

References

swamp palm bulbul
swamp palm bulbul
Birds of Sub-Saharan Africa
swamp palm bulbul
Taxonomy articles created by Polbot